The Big Blue River Bridge near Surprise, Nebraska is a pin-connected Pratt truss bridge that was built in 1897.  It was designed and built by the Canton Bridge Co. with steel fabricated by the Jones & Laughlin Steel Co.  Also denoted NEHBS No. BU00-84, it was listed on the National Register of Historic Places in 1992.  It was deemed significant as a relatively rare example, and one of the oldest examples documented in Nebraska, of a truss leg bedstead bridge.

As of 2010, the bridge was closed to traffic. The Bridge is no longer closed.

References

External links 

Road bridges on the National Register of Historic Places in Nebraska
Bridges completed in 1897
Buildings and structures in Butler County, Nebraska
National Register of Historic Places in Butler County, Nebraska
Transportation in Butler County, Nebraska
Steel bridges in the United States
Pratt truss bridges in the United States